Michael Peter Cather (born December 17, 1970) is an American professional baseball coach and a former professional baseball right-handed pitcher who appeared in Major League Baseball (MLB) in three seasons (1997–99) for the Atlanta Braves. In , he was named minor league pitching coordinator of the Miami Marlins.

Born in San Diego, California, Cather also pitched in the organizations of the Texas Rangers, Florida Marlins, and St. Louis Cardinals during a ten-year pro career.

Pitching career
He attended the University of California at Berkeley where he participated in college baseball. In college, he had pitched in the 1992 College World Series. He was drafted in the 41st round of the  free-agent draft by the Texas Rangers and was signed on June 5, 1993. On June 14, 1995, he was released by the Texas Rangers and was purchased by the Atlanta Braves from Winnipeg (Northern) on February 2, 1996.

Cather made his major league debut on July 13,  at age 26 with the Atlanta Braves. On that day, the New York Mets were playing against the Atlanta Braves at Turner Field with 42,111 people attending the game. In the top of the seventh inning, Cather was called to replace Keith Lockhart pitching and batting ninth. He pitched two innings, striking out one batter and allowing only one base on balls. At the end of the game, the Atlanta Braves lost against the New york Mets with the score at 7–6.

He did not allow an earned run over his first eight games. He earned his first major-league win on September 22 in the Braves’ 11-inning, 3–2 win against the Montreal Expos, the same night the Braves earned the National League Eastern Division title. In the National League Division Series that year, he pitched two scoreless innings in Game 2 against the Houston Astros and did not allow a run over four games in the National League Championship Series against the Florida Marlins.

In the  season, he played and made it on the Opening Day roster. On August 31 of the same season, Cather was placed on the 60-day disabled list due to a circulatory problem of Cather's right arm. He had surgery in October in order to remove his first rib on his right side, which was impinging on an artery (thoracic outlet syndrome). He then was able to play the  season, playing his last Major League Baseball game on April 12, 1999, and was granted free agency on October 15. In , he played Triple-A in Minor League Baseball in the Florida Marlins organization. In , he played in the St. Louis Cardinals organization.

Instructor, coach and scout
In , he joined the Boston Red Sox organization as the pitching coach for the Wilmington Blue Rocks of the Class A Carolina League. In –11, he was one of the MLB Red Sox' advance scouts. He then returned to coaching in  when he was named the roving minor league pitching coordinator of the San Diego Padres.

After two years in that position, he was named the  pitching coach of the El Paso Chihuahuas, the Padres' affiliate in the Triple-A Pacific Coast League.  Then, in December 2014, Cather joined the Chicago Cubs' organization as pitching coach of the  Triple-A Iowa Cubs, holding that post for one season before rejoining the Marlins as minor league pitching coordinator.

On July 11, 2017, Cather was named the pitching coach for Arizona State University. On June 15, 2019, Cather was relieved of his duties as pitching coach at Arizona State.

References

External links

Baseball Almanac
Baseball Library
Baseball Dope
Internet Baseball League
Pura Pelota (Venezuelan Winter League)

1970 births
Living people
American expatriate baseball players in Canada
Atlanta Braves players
Arizona State Sun Devils baseball coaches
Baseball coaches from California
Baseball players from San Diego
Boston Red Sox scouts
Calgary Cannons players
California Golden Bears baseball players
Charlotte Rangers players
Greenville Braves players
Gulf Coast Rangers players
Macon Peaches players
Major League Baseball pitchers
Memphis Redbirds players
Richmond Braves players
Tiburones de La Guaira players
American expatriate baseball players in Venezuela
Tulsa Drillers players
University of California, Berkeley alumni
Winnipeg Goldeyes players